David Anderson is an Australian former professional rugby league footballer who played in 1990s. He played for Western Suburbs, Balmain Tigers and Parramatta Eels in the NSWRL/ARL competition and for Rochdale in England.

Playing career
Anderson made his first grade debut for Balmain in round 1 of the 1991 NSWRL season against Canterbury-Bankstown at Leichhardt Oval. Anderson scored a try during Western Suburbs 26-16 loss. In 1992, Anderson joined Western Suburbs and played 23 games for the club over the next two seasons. Anderson then had a stint in England with Rochdale before returning to Australia and signing with Parramatta for the 1996 ARL season. Anderson made only one appearance for Parramatta which came in round 15 against Manly-Warringah with Parramatta losing 44-0 at Brookvale Oval.

References

1969 births
Western Suburbs Magpies players
Balmain Tigers players
Parramatta Eels players
Rochdale Hornets players
Australian rugby league players
Rugby league wingers
Living people